is a Japanese actress represented by Kabushikigaisha Sanyō Kikaku.

Filmography

Films

TV dramas
NHK

Tokyo Broadcasting System

Nippon TV

Fuji Television
{|class="wikitable"
|-
! Year
! Title
! Role
! Notes
|-
| 1967 || Lion Okusamagekijō || ||
|-
| 1969 || Yoshida Shōin || ||
|-
| 1970 || Ōzakajō no On'na || ||
|-
|rowspan="2"| 1971 || Nyonin Musashi || Setsu ||
|-
|Tokugawa On'naemaki || Sayo ||
|-
|rowspan="2"| 1972 || Nemuri Kyōshirō || Miho-dai || Episodes 1, 2, 22, and 26
|-
|Ninpō Kagerō Kiri || Kaoru Chiyo ||
|-
| 1981 || Kutsukake Tokijirō || Okinu ||
|-
| 1984 || Oregon Kara Ai || ||
|-
| 1989 || Naokishō Sakka Suspense || ||
|-
| 1991 || Chūshingura Kaze no Maki Kumo no Maki || Riku ||
|-
|rowspan="2"| 1993 || Hadaka no Taishō || ||
|-
|'Kin'yō Entertainment || ||
|-
| 2013 || Hakui no Namida || Mitsuko Ando ||
|-
| 2015 || Iyashi-ya Kiriko no Yakusoku || Tsutako Takada || Episodes 30 and 31
|}TV AsahiTV Tokyo'''

Stage

References

External links
Profile at Yahoo! Japan 

1942 births
Living people
People from Tokyo
20th-century Japanese actresses
21st-century Japanese actresses
Japanese film actresses
Japanese television actresses